Pea Ream Commune is a khum (commune) in Bati District, Takéo Province, Cambodia.

Administration 
As of 2019, Pea Ream Commune has 8 phums (villages) as follows.

References 

Communes of Takéo province
Bati District